The 1989 Gator Bowl may refer to:

 1989 Gator Bowl (January) - January 1, 1989, game between the Georgia Bulldogs and the Michigan State Spartans
 1989 Gator Bowl (December) - December 30, 1989, game between the Clemson Tigers and the West Virginia Mountaineers